Pinnacle Air is an Indian charter airline based  in Delhi. It was founded in 2004, and operations only began in the year 2008.  The airline operates passenger charters to destinations across the country.

Destinations
The airline was to start scheduled domestic operations from August 2018 under the Regional Connectivity Scheme however this never materialized.
The airline had planned serve the following destinations.

Fleet
The airline operates the following aircraft as of January 2018 :

References

Airlines established in 2004
Airlines of India
2004 establishments in Delhi
Indian companies established in 2004
Companies based in Delhi
Transport in Delhi